The University Record may refer to:

 The former name of the newspaper of Trinity College Dublin; now known as The University Times
 The weekly newspaper of the University of Michigan